The Bolivian Democratic Union (Spanish: Unión Democrática Boliviana, UDB) was a right-wing political party in Bolivia founded by Carlos Valdez Molina and Nidio Calavi Castellanos in 1978.

In 1979 it allied with the Bolivian Union Party and its candidate Walter Gonzáles Valda.

It disbanded following the Bolivian coup d'état on 17 July 1980.

Notes

Defunct political parties in Bolivia
Political parties established in 1978
1978 establishments in Bolivia
Political parties disestablished in 1980
1980 disestablishments in Bolivia